That's Not Funny, That's Sick is an American album of sketch comedy that was first released as a vinyl record in 1977. It was a spin-off from National Lampoon magazine. The album is a collection of sketches, several of which were taken from the National Lampoon Radio Hour, a radio show that was broadcast on 600 radio stations and ran from November 17, 1973 to December 28, 1974.

The sketches on That's Not Funny, That's Sick star John Belushi, Brian Doyle-Murray, Bill Murray, and Christopher Guest, and feature, among others, Richard Belzer.

In 2003, the full 27-track album was released on CD by Uproar Entertainment. In August, 2020, a "Digitally Remastered" version was released on YouTube and miscellaneous streaming services. The digital release shuffles the track order and omits one track, "Confession".

Track listing
 The Squalor Show
 Confession
 Dick Ballantine Phone Show #1
 Disco Hotline
 Dick Ballantine Phone Show #2
 Love Birds / Flashanova
 Listener Sponsored Radio #1
 For $25,000
 Gymnasty
 Dick Ballantine Phone Show #3
 Yiddishco
 Listener Sponsored Radio #2
 Pulp
 For $15,000
 Rapeline
 Mr. Roberts #1
 Stereos and Such
 Listener Sponsored Radio #3
 Height Report Disco
 Mr. Roberts #2
 Dial-A-Curse
 Humpback Whales
 Listener Sponsored Radio #4
 2,015 Year Old Man
 Fasten Your Seatbelts
 Listener Sponsored Radio #5
 Monolithic Oil

References

External links
 Last.fm listing, includes track list and samples

National Lampoon albums
Radar Records albums
1977 albums
1970s comedy albums